Andreas Mies and Oscar Otte were the defending champions but only Mies chose to defend his title, partnering Kevin Krawietz. Mies successfully defended his title.

Krawietz and Mies won the title after defeating Sander Gillé and Joran Vliegen 6–3, 2–6, [10–4] in the final.

Seeds

Draw

References
 Main Draw

Garden Open - Doubles
2018 Doubles
Garden